Andrew Jarvie (born 5 October 1948 in Annathill, North Lanarkshire) is a Scottish former footballer, known mostly for his time with Aberdeen

At Aberdeen he made 386 appearances (53 as substitute) and scored 131 goals as well winning the Scottish League Cup and Scottish League. On joining Aberdeen in 1972, he became the then-record signing for Aberdeen, having cost £72,000, and formed a successful partnership with Joe Harper. Before he joined Aberdeen, he played for Airdrieonians, where he formed a prolific partnership with Drew Busby. After leaving Aberdeen in 1982, he played for Airdrie again and then had a spell with St Mirren. He was capped three times by the Scottish national side while with Airdrie in 1971.

Since retirement, he has and continues to be involved in various coaching capacities including at former club Aberdeen alongside Alex Smith and Jocky Scott. Jarvie also served as Ian Porterfield's assistant at South Korean club Busan I'Cons during the 2003 K-League season.

In December 2008, Jarvie recovered from major heart valve repair surgery, having had regular hospital appointments monitoring the condition for a considerable period before.

Jarvie is an inductee of the Aberdeen Hall of Fame and was rewarded for his service with a testimonial in 1982 against Ipswich Town.

Career statistics

Club

International

References

External links

1948 births
Living people
Aberdeen F.C. players
Scottish footballers
Scotland international footballers
Airdrieonians F.C. (1878) players
St Mirren F.C. players
Scottish Football League players
Association football forwards
Kilsyth Rangers F.C. players
Scottish Football League representative players
Footballers from North Lanarkshire
Scotland under-23 international footballers
Scottish Junior Football Association players
Scotland junior international footballers